Pulp is a British comedy film directed by Adam Hamdy and Shaun Magher, starring Jay Sutherland and John Thomson, In March 2013, it was released exclusively on Xbox Live, becoming the first feature film to be distributed via a games console platform.

Plot 

Pulp tells the story of Tony Leary, the nice-guy owner of Junk Comics, who is gearing up for one last roll of the dice. He plans to launch his new superhero title, The Sodomizer, at the British International Comic Show, and nothing will stop Tony from making it a success. Nothing except a gang of Geordie criminals who are using another comic company to launder their dirty money. Tony is drafted by the police to identify the culprits and bring them to justice. Aided by his trusty geek sidekicks, Rick and Keith, Tony must defy the odds if he is to become a real life hero.

Cast 
 Jay Sutherland as Tony
 Gavin Molloy as Rick
 Simon Burbage as Keith
 Lucy Cudden as Sam
 John Thomson as Dave Burns
 Sarah Alexandra Marks as Laura
 Neil Jennings as Tyler
 Lee Ravitz as Clem
 Bhasker Patel as Stan
 Amelia Tyler as Ashley
 Brooke Burfitt as Noreen

Development 

Pulp was written by Bode O'Toole, based on a series of troubling events Adam Hamdy endured during his ten years of experience developing comics, notably one particularly eventful trip to San Diego Comic Con in 2010.

Hamdy's Dare Productions entered into a partnership with Midlands-based production company Reels in Motion in order to develop Pulp in late 2010. Filming took place in Birmingham, Stoke-on-Trent and Altrincham with principal photography wrapping in early 2011.

In April 2011, the producers of Pulp announced a deal with Aol to distribute online videos based on the Pulp brand.

In January 2013, the producers of Pulp announced a deal with Microsoft to distribute Pulp on the Xbox, making Pulp the first feature film to ever premiere on the platform.

The film was released exclusively on Xbox Live on 4 March 2013.

Pulp marks a departure for a movie release by bypassing the usual route to viewers via traditional distribution models involving theaters or DVDs. The success of such a model could see more films being released in such a format.

References

External links 
 Official Pulp Movie Website
 

2012 comedy films
British comedy films
Films set in the 2010s
British independent films
2012 films
2012 independent films
2010s English-language films
2010s British films